The Ottoman Civil War was a war of succession in the Ottoman Empire from 1509 to 1512, during the reign of Bayezid II, between his two sons Ahmed and Selim.

In 1509, Ahmed, the older claimant, won a battle against the Karaman Turks and their Safavid allies in Asia Minor and marched on Constantinople to exploit his triumph. Fearing for his safety, Selim staged a revolt in Thrace but was defeated by Bayezid and forced to flee to Crimea in 1511. 

Bayezid II developed fears that Ahmed might then kill him to gain the throne and refused to allow his son to enter Constantinople.

Selim returned from Crimea and, with support from the Janissaries, defeated and killed Ahmed. Bayezid II then abdicated the throne on April 25, 1512 and departed for retirement in his native Demotika, but he died along the way and is buried next to Bayezid Mosque, in Constantinople.

See also
Şahkulu Rebellion

References

Sources
 Finkel, Caroline, Osman's Dream, Basic Books, 2005.

Wars involving the Ottoman Empire
Wars of succession involving the states and peoples of Asia
Conflicts in 1509
Conflicts in 1510
Conflicts in 1511
Conflicts in 1512
1509 in the Ottoman Empire
1510s in the Ottoman Empire
Wars of succession involving the states and peoples of Europe